Arlind Kurti (born 24 January 2005) is an Albanian professional footballer who plays as a centre-back for Albanian club KF Laçi.

Career
He made his professional debut on 26 May 2021, the final day of the 2020–21 season, in a 6–1 loss to Teuta who secured the Kategoria Superiore title for the first time in 27 years with the victory. In doing so, he became the youngest ever Kategoria Superiore player at 16 years, 4 months and 2 days, beating the record set by Skënderbeu's Skerdi Xhixho earlier that same day.

References

2005 births
Living people
Association football defenders
Albanian footballers
Albania youth international footballers
KF Apolonia Fier players
Kategoria Superiore players